The 2012–13 season was the 112th season of competitive association football and the 86th season in the Football League played by Tranmere Rovers Football Club, a professional football club based in Birkenhead, Wirral. During the season, Tranmere Rovers competed in Football League One under Ronnie Moore in his first full season in charge.

Season summary
Tranmere enjoyed a fine start to the season, standing top of League One at the end of January. Injuries to key players including Andy Robinson, Jean-Louis Akpa Akpro and captain James Wallace sparked a dramatic downturn in form. Tranmere fell to sixth by the end of March and finished the season 11th with no goals scored in their final six games.

Background and pre-season

League One

League table

Results by matchday

Matches

FA Cup

Football League Cup

Football League Trophy

Players
Transfers, contract extensions and loans are listed from the last day of the previous season till the final day of this season

Transfers

Contract extensions

Loans

Season statistics

† Statuses are mentioned for youth academy players without senior contract and players who were signed on non-contract basis or on loan. Dates joined and left are mentioned only for players who changed club between the first and the last matchday of the season.

References 

2012-13
2012–13 Football League One by team